Starmites is a musical with music and lyrics by Barry Keating and a book by Stuart Ross and Barry Keating. It was first presented in 1980 Off-Off-Broadway by the Ark Theatre Company. It opened off-Broadway in 1987 and on-Broadway on April 27, 1989, where it ran for 60 performances. It received six nominations at the 43rd Tony Awards, including Best Musical, but won none.

The story revolves around a shy teenager, Eleanor, who creates a fantasy world involving science fiction characters in her comic book collection.  She escapes into her fantasy world where the Starmites are the guardian angels of Innerspace.

History
Starmites was staged off-Broadway by Musical Theater Works at the CSC Theater in 1987, with staging by Mark Herko. It featured Liz Larsen, Gabriel Barre, and Sharon McNight. It was staged in Milford, New Hampshire at the now-defunct American Stage Festival, August 10–27, 1988. That staging was directed by Larry Carpenter, and featured Liz Larsen and Sharon McNight, all of whom would remain with the show when it opened on Broadway at Criterion Center Stage Right on April 27, 1989 and closed on June 18, 1989 after 60 performances and 35 previews. Directed and staged by Larry Carpenter with choreography by Michele Assaf, it featured Liz Larsen as Eleanor and Bizarbara, Gabriel Barre as Trinkulus, Brian Lane Green as Spacepunk, and Sharon McNight as Diva and Eleanor's mother. 

Currently, there are three versions of Starmites available through Samuel-French for amateur and professional performance: Starmites Lite, a junior version of Starmites, intended for grade school and middle school performances; Starmites High School; and Starmites Pro, intended for professional-level performance.

Recording
A recording featuring members of the original Broadway cast was released on April 27, 1999 on the Original Cast Record label (ASIN: B00000GBYT).

Songs

 Act I
 "Superhero Girl" - Eleanor
 "Starmites" - Starmites and Spacepunk
 "Trink's Narration" - Trinkulus and Starmites
 "Afraid of the Dark" - Spacepunk, Starmites, Eleanor, and Trinkulus
 "Little Hero" - Eleanor
 "Attack of Banshees" - Banshees
 "Hard to be a Diva" - Diva and Banshees
 "Love Duet" - Spacepunk and Eleanor 
 "The Dance of Spousal Arousal" - Banshees and Bizarbara
 "Finaletto" - Company
 		 
 Act II
 "Entre'acte" - Band
 "Bizarbara's Wedding" - Bizarbara and Banshees
 "Milady" - Spacepunk and Starmites
 "Beauty Within" - Diva and Bizarbara
 "The Cruelty Stomp" - Trinkulus and Company
 "Reach Right Down" - Starmites, Diva, and Banshees
 "Immolation" - Eleanor, Shak Graa, and Spacepunk
 "Starmites/Diva (Reprise)" - Diva, Starmites, and Banshees
 "Finale - Company

Awards and nominations

Original Broadway production

References
New York Times review, April 29, 1987

External links
Internet Broadway Database listing
plot at musicalheaven
Starmites official website

Broadway musicals
1987 musicals
Original musicals